Andrew Kent Allison (1848 – March 21, 1897) was an American professional baseball player who played first base in Major League Baseball for the 1872 Brooklyn Eckfords. He was the older brother of Eckfords teammate Bill Allison.

Allison was born in New York City, the son of Scottish immigrants James and Jane Allison. In 1871, he married Elizabeth Holzberger at Ainslie St Presbyterian Church in Brooklyn.

References

External links

1848 births
1897 deaths
Major League Baseball first basemen
Brooklyn Eckfords (NABBP) players
Brooklyn Eckfords players
19th-century baseball players
Date of birth missing
American people of Scottish descent
Burials at Cypress Hills Cemetery
Baseball players from New York City